Magic Card is a 2015 Chinese romance action comedy film directed by Kwok-Man Keung. The film was released on October 16, 2015.

Cast
Qiao Renliang
Zhang Xinyu
Simon Yam
Kainan Bai
Dada Chan
Maria Grazia Cucinotta
Yida Cai
Ying Yin
Adriano Giannini
Wayne Zhang
Zhang Yishan
Luxia Jiang
Zhonglin He
Yaliang Nie
Zhu Guanghu

Reception
The film has earned  at the Chinese box office.

References

2015 action comedy films
2015 romantic comedy films
Chinese action comedy films
Chinese romantic comedy films
Films set in Milan
Films shot in Milan
2010s English-language films
2010s Mandarin-language films